Andrea Ramírez may refer to:
 Andrea Ramírez (cyclist) (born 1999), Mexican racing cyclist
 Andrea Ramírez (taekwondo) (born 1998), Colombian taekwondo practitioner
 Andrea Ramírez Limón (born 1992), Mexican marathon runner
 Andrea Ramirez (painter), 16th-century Spanish painter